Hampden is a town on the Penobscot River estuary in Penobscot County, Maine, United States. The population was 7,709 at the 2020 census. Hampden is part of the Bangor metropolitan statistical area.

History
The town was originally called Wheelersborough after its original settler, Benjamin Wheeler. It was incorporated on February 24, 1794, and named after the English patriot John Hampden.

During the War of 1812, on September 3, 1814, about 400 local militia under the command of Brigadier General John Blake of nearby Brewer attempted to hold off a superior force of British regulars at Hampden. The American line, however, collapsed before a charge and was quickly routed. The Americans suffered one fatality with eleven wounded, and the British lost two (one an officer). A civilian spectator was also killed. The British fleet, which under command of Sir John Coape Sherbrooke (then lieutenant governor of Nova Scotia) had recently captured Castine, looted Hampden and nearby Bangor. They were trying to capture the USS Adams, a frigate with 750 men which had fled up the Penobscot River and anchored at Hampden. The crew of Adams, under Captain Charles Morris, burned the ship to prevent her capture and subsequently escaped overland.

General Blake and two other officers, Lieutenant-Colonel Andrew Grant of Hampden and Major Joshua Chamberlain of Brewer (grandfather of Civil War general Joshua L. Chamberlain), were court-martialed in Bangor in 1816 for their part in the defeat. Blake and Chamberlain were both exonerated, but Grant was cashiered.

Geography
It is drained by the Souadabscook Stream and Penobscot River.

Hampden is crossed by Interstate 95, U.S. Route 1A and U.S. Route 202, as well as Maine State Route 9 and Maine State Route 69. It is bordered by the towns of Winterport to the south, Newburgh to the west, Hermon to the north, Bangor to the northeast, and (separated by the Penobscot River) Brewer to the northeast and Orrington to the east.

Climate
This climatic region is typified by large seasonal temperature differences, with warm to hot (and often humid) summers and cold (sometimes severely cold) winters.  According to the Köppen Climate Classification system, Hampden has a humid continental climate, abbreviated "Dfb" on climate maps.

Demographics

2010 census
As of the census of 2010, there were 7,257 people, 2,862 households, and 2,053 families living in the town. The racial makeup of the town was 96.8% White, 0.5% African American, 0.6% Native American, 0.8% Asian, 0.2% from other races, and 1.1% from two or more races. Hispanic or Latino people of any race were 1.1% of the population.

There were 2,862 households, of which 35.4% had children under the age of 18 living with them, 58.4% were married couples living together, 9.6% had a female householder with no husband present, 3.8% had a male householder with no wife present, and 28.3% were non-families. 21.5% of all households were made up of individuals, and 8.2% had someone living alone who was 65 years of age or older. The average household size was 2.53 and the average family size was 2.95.

The median age in the town was 40.8 years. 24.6% of residents were under the age of 18; 6.5% were between the ages of 18 and 24; 25.1% were from 25 to 44; 30.9% were from 45 to 64; and 13% were 65 years of age or older. The gender makeup of the town was 49.6% male and 50.4% female.

2000 census
As of the census of 2000, there were 6,327 people, 2,433 households, and 1,802 families living in the town. The racial makeup of the town was 97.91% White, 0.40% Black or African American, 0.35% Native American, 0.63% Asian, 0.17% from other races, and 0.54% from two or more races. Hispanic or Latino people of any race were 0.51% of the population.

There were 2,433 households, out of which 37.2% had children under the age of 18 living with them, 61.7% were married couples living together, 9.6% had a female householder with no husband present, and 25.9% were non-families. 20.2% of all households were made up of individuals, and 7.9% had someone living alone who was 65 years of age or older.  The average household size was 2.60 and the average family size was 3.01.

In the town, the population was spread out, with 27.1% under the age of 18, 6.1% from 18 to 24, 29.2% from 25 to 44, 26.9% from 45 to 64, and 10.7% who were 65 years of age or older.  The median age was 39 years. For every 100 females there were 93.7 males.  For every 100 females age 18 and over, there were 88.2 males.

The median income for a household in the town was $53,377, and the median income for a family was $61,321. Males had a median income of $45,775 versus $29,183 for females. The per capita income for the town was $26,498.  About 3.0% of families and 3.5% of the population were below the poverty line, including 3.3% of those under age 18 and 4.0% of those age 65 or over.

Site of interest
 Hampden Historical Society & Kinsley House Museum
 Colford's Beach
 Hermon Pond
 Lura Hoit Memorial Pool

Public safety

In 2019, Hampden was ranked the second safest city in Maine based on 2017 data. The ranking is based on zero violent crimes and 7.33 property crimes per 1,000 residents.

Notable people 

 James Sproat Brown (1824–1878), US congressman for Wisconsin, born in Hampden
 Philip Marshall Brown (1875–1966), US ambassador, born in Hampden
 John Crosby (1828–1887), founder of the Washburn-Crosby Company, the forerunner to General Mills, born in Hampden
 Dorothea Dix (1802–1887), activist, born in Hampden
 Brian Duprey, former member of the Maine House of Representatives for Hampden
 Charles Hamlin (1837–1911), brigadier general in the Civil War; member of the Maine House of Representatives, born in Hampden
 Cyrus Hamlin (1839–1867), Civil War era general, born in Hampden
 Hannibal Hamlin (1809–1891), vice-president of the United States, lived in Hampden
 Carolyn Hopkins, prominent public service announcer, whose voice recorded announcements are heard worldwide; lives in Hampden
 Hiram Knowles (1834–1911), federal judge, born in Hampden
 Ralph W. 'Bud' Leavitt Jr. (1917–1994), Bangor sportswriter, outdoor columnist, and television host; lived in Hampden
 Lewis Mayo (1828–1907), Minnesota state senator, born in Hampden
 Thompson H. Murch (1838–1886), US congressman, born in Hampden
 Charles Stetson (1801–1863), US congressman, grew up in Hampden
 Wilbur N. Taylor (1846–1903), Medal of Honor recipient, born in Hampden

References

External links
 
 Edythe L. Dyer Community Library
 Hampden Business Association
 

 
Towns in Penobscot County, Maine
Towns in Maine